Novomeshcherovo (Yañı Mişär) is a rural locality (a village) and the administrative centre of Novomeshcherovsky Selsoviet, Mechetlinsky District, Bashkortostan, Russia. The population was 526 as of 2010. There are 6 streets.

Geography 
Novomeshcherovo is located 50 km south of Bolsheustyikinskoye (the district's administrative centre) by road. Yasinovo is the nearest rural locality.

References 

Rural localities in Mechetlinsky District